Streptomyces atratus is a bacterium species from the genus Streptomyces which has been isolated from soil in Shimoneda in Japan. Streptomyces atratus produces atramycin A, hydrazidomycins A, hydrazidomycins B, hydrazidomycins C, rufomycins A and rufomycins B.

See also 
 List of Streptomyces species

References

Further reading

External links
Type strain of Streptomyces atratus at BacDive – the Bacterial Diversity Metadatabase

atratus
Bacteria described in 1962